Mohamed Awad (born 7 May 1994) is a footballer who plays as a winger for Sliema Wanderers F.C.. Born in New Zealand, he represents the Somalia national team.

Club career
Awad began his senior career at New Zealand Football Championship club Waikato, after a spell in the youth system at Waikato. After failing to make any appearances for Waikato, Awad signed for Western Suburbs in 2013. In 2014, Awad moved to the United States, playing college soccer for St. John's Red Storm. Between 2015 and 2017, Awad played college soccer for SIU Edwardsville Cougars and domestic football for Australian club Inglewood United. In 2018, Awad moved back to New Zealand, signing for Eastern Suburbs. Awad made 22 league appearances, scoring three times, during his two seasons at the club, winning the 2018–19 New Zealand Football Championship. In 2020, Awad signed for Auckland City.

International career
On 15 June 2021, Awad made his debut for Somalia, in a 1–0 friendly loss against Djibouti.

Personal life
Born in New Zealand, prior to receiving his call up for the Somalia national team, Awad had never been to the country.

References

1994 births
Living people
People with acquired Somali citizenship
Somalian footballers
Somalia international footballers
New Zealand association footballers
New Zealand people of Somali descent
Association football wingers
Waikato FC players
Western Suburbs FC (New Zealand) players
St. John's Red Storm men's soccer players
Inglewood United FC players
SIU Edwardsville Cougars men's soccer players
Eastern Suburbs AFC players
Auckland City FC players
New Zealand Football Championship players
New Zealand expatriate association footballers
New Zealand expatriate sportspeople in Australia
New Zealand expatriate sportspeople in the United States
Expatriate soccer players in Australia
Expatriate soccer players in the United States
Stirling Macedonia FC players